The trampoline gymnastics tournaments at the 2001 World Games in Akita was played between 19 and 21 August. 75 acrobatic gymnastics competitors, from 22 nations, participated in the tournament. The trampoline gymnastics competition took place at Akita City Gymnasium.

Participating nations

Medal table

Events

Men's events

Women's events

References

External links
 Fédération Internationale de Gymnastique
 Gymnastics on IWGA website
 Results

 
2001 World Games
World Games
2001
International gymnastics competitions hosted by Japan